By the Time It Gets Dark, known in Thai as Dao Khanong, is a 2016 Thai drama film directed by Anocha Suwichakornpong. It won the 2016 Suphannahong National Film Awards for Best Picture. It was also selected as the Thai entry for the Best Foreign Language Film at the 90th Academy Awards, but it was not nominated.

Plot
The 1976 Thammasat University massacre is experienced through several individuals working to create a film about the event.

Cast
 Arak Amornsupasiri
 Apinya Sakuljaroensuk
 Achtara Suwan
 Visra Vichit-Vadakan
 Penpak Sirikul

Critical response
The film has a rating of 87% on Rotten Tomatoes and a 73 score on Metacritic.

See also
 List of submissions to the 90th Academy Awards for Best Foreign Language Film
 List of Thai submissions for the Academy Award for Best Foreign Language Film

References

External links
 

2016 films
2016 drama films
Thai drama films
Thai-language films
Drama films based on actual events
Best Picture Suphannahong National Film Award winners
Films about film directors and producers